A mobcap (or mob cap or mob-cap) is a round, gathered or pleated cloth (usually linen) bonnet consisting of a caul to cover the hair, a frilled or ruffled brim, and (often) a ribbon band, worn by married women in the 18th and early 19th centuries, when it was called a "bonnet". These caps were always gathered to a flat, often curved, brim. The caul had a flat bottom and curved top.  The bottom was typically gathered to fit the back neck with a drawstring, while the curved sides and top were tightly gathered and stitched to the brim, which typically had some curves, too.  Originally an informal style, the bonnet became a high-fashion item as part of the adoption of simple "country" clothing in the later 18th century.  It was an indoor fashion, and was worn under a hat for outdoor wear.

Etymology
The origin of the term mobcap is a compound of mob "dishabille, casually dressed" + cap. It may be modeled on Dutch mop(muts) "woman's cap".

From at least 1730 to at least 1750, a single mob cap could be referred to as "a suit of mobs" or 'a suit of mobbs', while the plural mob caps could be described as 'suits of mobs' or 'suits of mobbs'.

In 1820, an issue of The Ladies' Monthly Museum puts it thusly:[A]s mobs do not become everybody

Variations
The one piece, ruffled, gathered circle mobcap often seen worn with historical costumes is a simplified, modern interpretation, rather than a copy of a period cap.
 
By the Victorian period, mobcaps lingered as the head covering of servants and nurses, and small mobcaps, not covering the hair,  remained part of these uniforms into the early 20th century.

Modern versions of mobcaps are still worn in the pharmaceutical industry, in clean-rooms, and in other sectors where the hair has to be contained.  These mobcaps are usually a simple circle shape with an elastic band and may be made of disposable materials such as spun-bound polypropylene so they are like a shower cap. They can also be made of nylon netting.

Gallery

References

External links 
 

American clothing
English clothing
Hats
Headgear